Douglas Silva (born 27 September 1988) is a Brazilian actor. He is known for playing Dadinho (Li'l Dice)  in the 2002 Brazilian film, City of God. He also played Acerola in the spin-off series City of Men and the 2007 film based on it.

He became the first Brazilian actor to be nominated for the International Emmy Award.

Personal life
He married on 7 November 2008 with Carolina Brito at a party house in Jacarepaguá, Rio de Janeiro. The same day Carolina was celebrating her birthday. They have two children: Maria Flor, and Morena.

Awards and nominations

References

External links
 
 

1988 births
Living people
Male actors from Rio de Janeiro (city)
Afro-Brazilian male actors
Brazilian male film actors
Brazilian male television actors
Big Brother (franchise) contestants
Big Brother Brasil